Ťapešovo is municipality (village) near Námestovo, Žilina Region, Slovakia. It is located on the Biela Orava river. The first written mention of Ťapešovo comes from 1580. In 1588 Ťapešovo was under the rule of the Orava Castle.

References

Villages and municipalities in Námestovo District